

Good Shepherd Convent, Colombo is a semi-government fee-levying Catholic girls' school and the first Catholic convent in Sri Lanka. Good Shepherd Convent, Kotahena is a leading Catholic girls' school in Colombo, Sri Lanka . Located in the neighbourhood of Kotahena, the convent school educates girls from Kindergarten to age 19.

The convent includes an auditorium, libraries, ICT and Science laboratories, Basketball and Netball courts and gyms.

Other works of Sisters of The Good Shepherd in Sri Lanka

The Good Shepherd congregation marked the beginning of the sisters' mission to British Ceylon and the Far East. Nuns from this original convent opened Good Shepherd Convent, Kandy, St Mary's School in Pettah (closed) and St Bridget's Convent in Cinnamon Gardens. In 1939, sisters based in Colombo expanded to Singapore, then part of the Straits Settlements, and present-day Malaysia.

Vision and Mission

Vision

Our Vision is to make our school,
Good Shepherd Convent - Kotahena,
one of the most fruitful, well disciplined and a leading school in the Island.

Mission

Instill the Good Shepherd values in the students entrusted to our care, empowering them to face the 21st century with its advanced technology and creative skills, with strength and confidence.
Embed in our students, a deep love and respect for the country, appreciative of her culture and a desire to contribute towards her growth and development.
Inculcating the Gospel values in our students and enabling them to live their day to day life, in an integrated, self-disciplined life of good character.
Our mission, as a team of educationists, is to contribute to society, a future generation of sterling character, with dedication to God and service to all without distinction.

Principals

Notable Alumni
 Tehani Egodawela (1986 - ) Olympic, national record-holding shooter
 Leonie Kotelawala (1944-2022), Actress 
 Pearl Vasudevi (1915 - 1987) Actress 
 Jeevarani Kurukulasuriya (1941 -) Actress

References

Sources

External links
Official Website

Catholic schools in Sri Lanka
Girls' schools in Sri Lanka
Educational institutions established in 1869
Schools in Colombo
1869 establishments in Ceylon